The following is a list of productions produced by DreamWorks Animation, a division of NBCUniversal, which includes animated feature films, shorts, specials, and television series.

Feature films

Released

Upcoming

In development

Television specials

Short films

 The films that were screened as part of DreamWorks Animation Week were: Shrek, Madagascar, Kung Fu Panda, How to Train Your Dragon, The Croods, and Trolls.

Miscellaneous work 
 74th Academy Awards (2002) (Animation for the characters of Shrek and Donkey in the audience during the award for Best Animated Feature)

Television series

Unproduced projects

Reception

Box office grosses

Critical and public response

Accolades

Edwin R. Leonard, CTO of DreamWorks Animation, won a special achievement award at the 2008 Annies for driving their innovative work with open-source software and Linux.

Academy Awards

Golden Globe Awards

Annie Awards

British Academy Film Awards

Critics' Choice Movie Awards

Kids' Choice Awards

National Board of Review

Heartland Film Festival

Satellite Award

Saturn Award

See also
 List of Illumination productions
 List of Universal Animation Studios productions
 List of Universal Pictures theatrical animated feature films
List of unproduced DreamWorks Animation projects
DreamWorks Animation Television

Notes

References

DreamWorks Animation
DreamWorks Animation
DreamWorks Animation